The year 1960 in film involved some significant events.


Top-grossing films (U.S.)

The top ten 1960 released films by box office gross in North America are as follows:

Top-grossing films by country
The highest-grossing 1960 films in countries outside of North America.

Events
  March 5 – For the first time since coming home from military service in Germany, Elvis Presley returns to Hollywood to film G.I. Blues 
 June 16 – Premiere of Alfred Hitchcock's landmark film, Psycho in the United States. Controversial since release, it sets new standards in violence and sexuality on screen, and is a critical influence on the emerging slasher genre.
 August 10 – Filming of West Side Story begins.
 October 6 & December 16 – Dalton Trumbo, one of the Hollywood Ten, receives full screenwriting credit for his work on the films Spartacus and Exodus, released in the United States on these dates.
 October 27 – Film Saturday Night and Sunday Morning released, first of the British social-realist wave.
 November 4 – Filming wraps on The Misfits, starring Marilyn Monroe and Clark Gable, the last film for both (though Monroe will be working on another at the time of her death).

Awards

1960 film releases
United States unless stated

January–March
January 1960
5 January
When a Woman Ascends the Stairs (Japan)
12 January
Mrs. Warren's Profession (West Germany)
20 January
The Immoral Mr. Teas
21 January
Toby Tyler
26 January 
Two Way Stretch (U.K.)
27 January
Cash McCall
28 January
The Lady with the Dog (U.S.S.R.)
February 1960
1 February
Hell Bent for Leather
3 February
The Rise and Fall of Legs Diamond
4 February
Visit to a Small Planet
5 February
La Dolce Vita (Italy)
11 February
Once More, with Feeling!
Sink the Bismarck! (U.K.)
19 February
Devi (India)
The Last Voyage
24 February
The Bramble Bush
Kidnapped
25 February
The Battle of the Sexes (U.K.)
27 February
Cleopatra's Daughter
The Hypnotic Eye
March 1960
1 March
Comanche Station
Heller in Pink Tights
2 March
Eyes Without a Face (France)
3 March
Home from the Hill
4 March
Never Take Sweets from a Stranger (U.K.)
5 March
The 3rd Voice
9 March
Can-Can
10 March
Purple Noon (France)
12 March
Seven Thieves
15 March
5 Branded Women
The Angry Silence (U.K.)
17 March
Breathless (France)
18 March
The Hole (France)
23 March
The Big Risk (France)
31 March
Please Don't Eat the Daisies

April–June
April 1960
2 April
Twelve Hours to Kill
5 April
The League of Gentlemen (U.K.)
6 April
Tall Story
The Unforgiven
10 April
The Secret of the Telegian (Japan)
Hell Is a City
13 April
Obaltan (South Korea)
14 April
The Fugitive Kind
15 April
Who Was That Lady?
21 April
The Ninth Circle (Yugoslavia)
27 April
The Demon of Mount Oe (Japan)
May 1960
16 May
Peeping Tom (U.K.)
17 May
The Challenge (U.K.)
19 May
Crack in the Mirror
Pollyanna
25 May
Faust (West Germany)
26 May
Wild River
June 1960
3 June
Cruel Story of Youth (Japan)
7 June
Never Let Go (U.K.)
9 June
Macario (Mexico)
15 June
The Apartment
16 June
Psycho
17 June
The Story of Ruth
A Terrible Beauty
22 June
The Gallant Hours
House of Usher
23 June
Bells Are Ringing
The Party Is Over (Argentina)
Portrait in Black
24 June
Dinosaurus!
28 June
Murder, Inc.
29 June
L'Avventura (Italy)
Strangers When We Meet

July–September
July 1960
7 July
The Brides of Dracula
Elmer Gantry
Inherit the Wind
10 July
13 Ghosts
The Rat Race
13 July
The Lost World
15 July
From the Terrace
Knights of the Teutonic Order (Poland)
20 July
The Bellboy
25 July
The Entertainer (U.K.)
30 July
Jigoku (Japan)
August 1960
5 August
Last Woman on Earth
Mughal-e-Azam (India)
Parakh (India)
7 August
It Started in Naples
9 August
Make Mine Mink (U.K.)
10 August
Jungle Cat
Ocean's 11
11 August
Black Sunday (Italy)
Song Without End
14 August
Alakazam the Great (Japan)
17 August
The Enchanting Shadow (Hong Kong)
The Time Machine
20 August
College Confidential
September 1960
6 September
Rocco and His Brothers (Italy/France)
8 September
Let's Make Love
9 September
September Storm
14 September
The Little Shop of Horrors
15 September
Under Ten Flags
16 September
High Time
19 September
The Bad Sleep Well (Japan)
28 September
Sunrise at Campobello
29 September
Kapo (Italy)
Surprise Package
30 September
Hell to Eternity

October–December
October 1960
1 October
Autumn Has Already Started
Never on Sunday (Greece/United States)
6 October
Spartacus
8 October
A False Student (Japan)
9 October
Night and Fog in Japan (Japan)
12 October
The Magnificent Seven
13 October
Midnight Lace
17 October
The Devil's Eye (Sweden)
18 October
The Millionairess (U.K.)
24 October
The Alamo
27 October
Everybody Go Home (Italy)
28 October
Zazie in the Metro (France)
31 October
Man in the Moon (U.K.)
November 1960
1 November
Her Brother (Japan)
Ten Who Dared
3 November
El Cochecito (Spain)
Five Cartridges (East Germany)
The Housemaid (South Korea)
4 November
BUtterfield 8
G.I. Blues
10 November
The World of Suzie Wong (U.K./U.S.)
13 November
Late Autumn (Japan)
North to Alaska
14 November
The Facts of Life
16 November
Fortunat (France/Italy)
22 November
Cinderfella
23 November
Go to Hell, Hoodlums!
The Naked Island (Japan)
25 November
Minotaur, the Wild Beast of Crete Italy)
December 1960
1 December
Cimarron
7 December
Village of the Damned (U.K.)
8 December
The Sundowners
9 December 
Barsaat Ki Raat (India)
11 December
The Human Vapor
12 December
The River of Love (Egypt)
The Yellow Gloves (Greece)
14 DecemberEsther and the King (U.S./Italy)
16 DecemberExodusThe 3 Worlds of Gulliver20 DecemberFlaming StarPepeTunes of Glory (U.K.)The Wackiest Ship in the Army21 DecemberSwiss Family Robinson23 DecemberThe Grass Is Greener28 DecemberWhere the Boys Are30 DecemberThe Last Witness (West Germany)

Notable films released in 1960
United States unless stated

#The 3rd Voice, directed by Hubert Cornfield, starring Edmond O'Brien, Laraine Day, Julie London5 Branded Women, directed by Martin Ritt, starring Vera Miles, Barbara Bel Geddes, Jeanne Moreau13 Ghosts, directed by William Castle

AAdua and Friends (Adua e le compagne), starring Simone Signoret – (Italy)Alakazam the Great (Saiyu-ki), an anime film – (Japan)The Alamo, directed by and starring John Wayne, co-starring Richard Widmark, Laurence Harvey, Chill Wills, Frankie Avalon, Richard BooneAli Baba Bujang Lapok – (Malaysia/Singapore)The Angry Silence, starring Richard Attenborough – (U.K.)Anuradha – (India)The Apartment, directed by Billy Wilder, starring Jack Lemmon, Shirley MacLaine, Fred MacMurray, Ray Walston, Jack Kruschen, Edie AdamsAutumn Has Already Started (Aki tachinu), directed by Mikio Naruse – (Japan)L'Avventura (The Adventure), directed by Michelangelo Antonioni – (Italy)

BBad Luck (Zezowate szczęście) – (Poland)Barsaat Ki Raat, starring Madhubala and Bharat Bhushan – (India)The Bad Sleep Well (Warui yatsu hodo yoku nemuru), directed by Akira Kurosawa, starring Toshiro Mifune – (Japan)Because They're Young, starring Dick ClarkBeat Girl, starring David Farrar, Gillian Hills, Adam Faith, Christopher Lee – (U.K.)The Bellboy, starring Jerry LewisBells Are Ringing, starring Dean Martin and Judy HollidayBeyond the Time BarrierThe Big Risk (Classe tous risques), starring Lino Ventura, Sandra Milo, Jean-Paul Belmondo – (France)Black Sunday (La maschera del demonio) – (Italy)Les Bonnes Femmes (The Girls), directed by Claude Chabrol – (France)The Bramble Bush, starring Richard Burton and Angie DickinsonBreathless (À bout de souffle), directed by Jean-Luc Godard, starring Jean-Paul Belmondo and Jean Seberg – (France)The Brides of Dracula, starring Peter Cushing – (U.K.)The Broken Pots (Kırık Çanaklar) – (Turkey)BUtterfield 8, directed by Daniel Mann, starring Elizabeth Taylor and Laurence Harvey

CCan-Can, starring Frank Sinatra, Shirley MacLaine, Louis Jourdan, Juliet ProwseCarry On Constable, starring Sid James and Eric Barker – (U.K.)Cash McCall, starring James Garner and Natalie WoodThe Challenge, a.k.a. It Takes A Thief, starring Jayne Mansfield – (U.K.)Cidade Ameaçada (a.k.a. Jerry the Gangster) – (Brazil)Cimarron, directed by Anthony Mann, starring Glenn Ford, Maria Schell, Anne BaxterCinderfella, starring Jerry Lewis and Anna Maria AlberghettiCircus of Horrors, starring Anton Diffring and Donald Pleasence – (U.K.)Cleopatra's Daughter, starring Debra PagetThe Cloud-Capped Star (Meghe Daka Tara), directed by Ritwik Ghatak – (India)El Cochecito (The Little Coach), directed by Marco Ferreri – (Spain)College Confidential, starring Mamie Van DorenComanche Station, directed by Budd Boetticher,  starring Randolph ScottCome Back, Africa, documentary film – (South Africa)Crack in the Mirror, directed by Richard Fleischer, starring Orson Welles, Bradford Dillman, Juliette GrécoThe Criminal, directed by Joseph Losey, starring Stanley Baker – (U.K.)Cruel Story of Youth (Seishun Zankoku Monogatari), directed by Nagisa Oshima – (Japan)

DThe Dark at the Top of the Stairs, starring Dorothy McGuire, Shirley Knight, Robert PrestonDentist in the Chair, starring Bob Monkhouse and Kenneth Connor – (U.K.)Desire in the Dust, starring Joan Bennett, Martha Hyer, Raymond BurrDevi (a.k.a. The Goddess), directed by Satyajit Ray – (India)The Devil's Eye (Djävulens öga), directed by Ingmar Bergman, starring Bibi Andersson – (Sweden)La Dolce Vita (The Sweet Life), directed by Federico Fellini, starring Marcello Mastroianni and Anita Ekberg – (Italy)

EElmer Gantry, directed by Richard Brooks, starring Burt Lancaster, Jean Simmons, Arthur Kennedy, Shirley JonesThe Enchanting Shadow (Ching nu yu hun) – (Hong Kong)The Entertainer, directed by Tony Richardson, starring Laurence Olivier – (U.K.)Esther and the King, starring Joan Collins and Richard Egan – (U.S./Italy)Everybody Go Home (Tutti a casa), directed by Luigi Comencini – (Italy)Exodus, directed by Otto Preminger, starring Paul Newman, Eva Marie Saint, Sal Mineo, Peter Lawford, Lee J. Cobb, John DerekEyes Without a Face (Les yeux sans visage), starring Pierre Brasseur and Alida Valli – (France)

FThe Facts of Life, starring Bob Hope and Lucille BallA False Student (Nise daigakusei) – (Japan)Faust – (West Germany)Five Cartridges (Fünf Patronenhülsen) – (East Germany)Flaming Star, starring Elvis Presley and Barbara EdenFortunat (Fortunate), starring Bourvil and Michèle Morgan – (France/Italy)From the Terrace, starring Paul Newman, Joanne Woodward, Ina Balin, George Grizzard, Myrna Loy

GG.I. Blues, starring Elvis Presley and Juliet ProwseThe Gallant Hours, a biopic of Admiral "Bull" Halsey starring James CagneyGirl of the Night, starring Anne Francis and John KerrGo to Hell, Hoodlums! (Kutabare gurentai) – (Japan)
Goliath and the DragonGoliath II, a Disney animated shortThe Grass Is Greener, starring Cary Grant, Deborah Kerr, Robert Mitchum, Jean SimmonsGuns of the Timberland, starring Alan Ladd

HHell Bent for Leather, starring Audie Murphy and Felicia FarrHell Is a City, starring Stanley Baker – (U.K.)Heller in Pink Tights, starring Sophia Loren and Anthony QuinnHell to Eternity, starring Jeffrey Hunter and David JanssenHer Brother (Otôto), directed by Kon Ichikawa – (Japan)High Time, starring Bing CrosbyHobbi al-Wahid (My Only Love), starring Omar Sharif – (Egypt)The Hole (Le Trou) (a.k.a. The Night Watch), directed by Jacques Becker – (France)Home from the Hill, directed by Vincente Minnelli, starring Robert Mitchum, Eleanor Parker, George PeppardHouse of Usher, directed by Roger Corman, starring Vincent PriceThe Housemaid (Hanyeo) – (South Korea)The Human Vapor (Gasu Ningen dai Ichigo), directed by Ishirō Honda – (Japan)The Hypnotic Eye, starring Jacques Bergerac

IIl Mattatore, directed by Dino Risi – (Italy)I Aim at the Stars, directed by J. Lee Thompson, starring Curd Jürgens, Herbert Lom, Gia ScalaIce Palace, starring Richard Burton, Robert Ryan and Carolyn JonesThe Iceman Cometh, directed by Sidney Lumet, starring Jason Robards, Jr., Myron McCormick, and Robert Redford – (made for TV)Inherit the Wind, directed by Stanley Kramer, starring Spencer Tracy, Fredric March, Gene Kelly, Harry Morgan, Dick YorkIt Started in Naples, starring Clark Gable and Sophia Loren

JJaali Note (Counterfeit Money), starring Madhubala and Dev Anand – (India)Jigoku (Hell) – (Japan)Jis Desh Men Ganga Behti Hai (The Land Where the Ganges Flows), starring Raj Kapoor – (India)

KKanoon (The Law), starring Ashok Kumar – (India)Knights of the Teutonic Order (Krzyżacy), directed by Aleksander Ford – (Poland)

LThe Lady with the Dog (Dama s sobachkoy) – (U.S.S.R.)The Last Voyage, starring Robert Stack and Dorothy MaloneThe Last Witness (Der Letzte Zeuge) – (West Germany)Last Woman on Earth, directed by Roger CormanLate Autumn (Akibiyori), directed by Yasujirō Ozu – (Japan)The League of Gentlemen, directed by Basil Dearden, starring Jack Hawkins – (U.K.)Let's Make Love, starring Marilyn Monroe and Yves MontandThe Little Shop of Horrors, directed by Roger CormanLinda, starring Carol White – (U.K.)The Lost World, starring Michael Rennie and Jill St. JohnLove and Adoration, directed by Hassan Al-Imam, starring Salah Zulfikar and Taheyya Kariokka – (Egypt)Love in Simla, starring Joy Mukherjee and Sadhana – (India)

MMacario, directed by Roberto Gavaldón – (Mexico)Macumba Love – (United States/Brazil)The Magnificent Seven, directed by John Sturges, starring Yul Brynner, Steve McQueen, Charles Bronson, Eli Wallach, Robert Vaughn, James Coburn, Brad Dexter, Horst BuchholzMake Mine Mink, starring Terry-Thomas – (U.K.)Makkers Staakt uw Wild Geraas (a.k.a. That Joyous Eve), directed by Fons Rademakers – (Netherlands)Man in the Moon, starring Kenneth More – (U.K.)Manzil (Destination), starring Dev Anand – (India)Midnight Lace, starring Doris Day, Rex Harrison, John Gavin, Myrna LoyThe Millionairess, directed by Anthony Asquith, starring Sophia Loren and Peter Sellers – (U.K.)Money and Women, directed by Hassan Al-Imam, starring Salah Zulfikar and Soad Hosny – (Egypt)The Mountain Road, starring James Stewart
 Mrs. Warren's Profession (Frau Warrens Gewerbe), starring Lilli Palmer (West Germany)Mughal-e-Azam (The Greatest of the Mughals), starring Madhubala and Dilip Kumar – (India)Murder, Inc., starring Peter Falk, Stuart Whitman, May Britt, Henry Morgan

NThe Naked Island (Hadaka no shima) – (Japan)Never Let Go, directed by John Guillermin, starring Richard Todd, Peter Sellers, Elizabeth Sellars and Adam Faith – (U.K.)Never on Sunday, directed by Jules Dassin, starring Melina Mercouri – (Greece/United States)Never Take Sweets from a Stranger, starring Patrick Allen and Gwen Watford – (U.K.)Night and Fog in Japan (Nihon no yoru to kiri), directed by Nagisa Oshima – (Japan)The Ninth Circle (Deveti krug) – (Yugoslavia)North to Alaska, starring John Wayne, Stewart Granger, Ernie Kovacs, Capucine, Fabian Forte

OObaltan (a.k.a. The Stray Bullet) – (South Korea)Ocean's 11, starring Frank Sinatra, Dean Martin, Sammy Davis, Jr., Peter Lawford, Joey Bishop, Angie DickinsonOnce More, with Feeling!, directed by Stanley Donen, starring Yul BrynnerOur Last Spring (a.k.a. Eroica), directed by Michael Cacoyannis – (Greece)

PParakh, directed by Bimal Roy – (India)The Party Is Over (Fin de fiesta) – (Argentina)Le Passage du Rhin, starring Charles Aznavour – (France/Italy/West Germany)Peeping Tom, directed by Michael Powell, starring Karl Boehm, Anna Massey, Moira Shearer – (U.K.)Pepe, starring CantinflasPlease Don't Eat the Daisies, starring Doris Day and David NivenPollyanna, starring Hayley MillsPortrait in Black, starring Lana Turner, Anthony Quinn, Sandra DeeThe Private Lives of Adam and Eve, starring Mickey Rooney and Mamie Van DorenPsycho, directed by Alfred Hitchcock, starring Anthony Perkins, Vera Miles, Janet Leigh, Martin Balsam, John GavinThe Pure Hell of St Trinian's, starring Cecil Parker and Joyce Grenfell – (U.K.)Purple Noon (Plein Soleil), a.k.a. Blazing Sun, directed by René Clément, starring Alain Delon – (France)

QThe Queen of Spades (Pikovaya dama) – (U.S.S.R.)

RThe Rat Race, starring Debbie Reynolds, Tony Curtis, Don RicklesThe Rise and Fall of Legs Diamond, directed by Budd Boetticher, starring Ray Danton and Karen SteeleThe River of Love (Nahr el hub), starring Omar Sharif – (Egypt)Rocco and His Brothers (Rocco e i suoi fratelli), directed by Luchino Visconti, starring Alain Delon – (Italy/France)Romeo, Juliet and Darkness (Romeo, Julie a tma) – (Czechoslovakia)The Running Jumping & Standing Still Film, directed by Richard Lester and Peter Sellers – (U.K.)

SSaturday Night and Sunday Morning, directed by Karel Reisz, starring Albert Finney, Shirley Anne Field, Rachel Roberts – (U.K.)The Savage Innocents, directed by Nicholas Ray, starring Anthony QuinnScent of Mystery, starring Denholm Elliott and Elizabeth TaylorSchool for Scoundrels, directed by Robert Hamer, starring Ian Carmichael and Terry-Thomas – (U.K.)September Storm, starring Joanne DruSergeant Rutledge, starring Jeffrey Hunter and Woody StrodeSeven Days... Seven Nights (Moderato cantabile), starring Jeanne Moreau – (France)Seven Thieves, starring Edward G. Robinson, Rod Steiger, Eli Wallach, Joan CollinsShoot the Pianist (Tirez sur le pianiste), directed by François Truffaut, starring Charles Aznavour – (France)Sink the Bismarck!, starring Kenneth More – (U.K.)The Skeleton of Mrs. Morales (El Esqueleto de la señora Morales), starring Arturo de Córdova – (Mexico)Song Without End, starring Dirk Bogarde, Capucine, Patricia MorisonSons and Lovers, directed by Jack Cardiff, starring Dean Stockwell and Trevor Howard – (U.K.)Spartacus, directed by Stanley Kubrick, starring Kirk Douglas, Laurence Olivier, Jean Simmons, Charles Laughton, John Gavin, Peter Ustinov, Tony CurtisThe Spider's Web, directed by Godfrey Grayson. Based on an Agatha Christie play (U.K.)The Story of Ruth, a Biblical drama starring Stuart Whitman and Peggy WoodStrangers When We Meet, starring Kim Novak, Kirk Douglas, Ernie KovacsStruggle for Eagle Peak (Venner) – (Norway)The Subterraneans, starring George PeppardThe Sundowners, directed by Fred Zinnemann, starring Deborah Kerr and Robert Mitchum – (US/UK/Australia)Summer of the Seventeenth Doll, a.k.a. Season of Passion, starring Anne Baxter, Angela Lansbury, Ernest Borgnine, John MillsSunrise at Campobello, starring Ralph Bellamy (as Franklin D. Roosevelt) and Greer GarsonSurprise Package, directed by Stanley Donen, starring Yul Brynner, Mitzi Gaynor, Noël CowardSwiss Family Robinson, starring John Mills and Dorothy McGuire

TTall Story, starring Jane Fonda, Anthony Perkins, Ray WalstonTarzan the Magnificent, starring Gordon Scott, Jock Mahoney, John CarradineA Terrible Beauty, directed by Tay Garnett, starring Robert Mitchum and Anne HeywoodTestament of Orpheus (Le Testament d'Orphée), directed by Jean Cocteau – (France)There Was a Crooked Man, starring Norman Wisdom – (U.K.)The Thousand Eyes of Dr. Mabuse (Die tausend Augen des Dr. Mabuse), directed by Fritz Lang – (West Germany)The Three Worlds of Gulliver, starring Kerwin MathewsThe Time Machine, starring Rod Taylor and Yvette MimieuxToo Hot to Handle, starring Jayne Mansfield – (U.K.)The Trials of Oscar Wilde, starring Peter Finch – (U.K.)The Truth (La Vérité), directed by Henri-Georges Clouzot, starring Brigitte Bardot – (France)Tunes of Glory, directed by Ronald Neame, starring Alec Guinness – (U.K.)Twelve Hours to Kill, starring Nico Minardos and Barbara EdenTwo-Way Stretch, starring Peter Sellers – (U.K.)Two Women, directed by Vittorio De Sica, starring Sophia Loren – (Italy)

UUnder Ten Flags, starring Van Heflin and Charles LaughtonThe Unforgiven, starring Burt Lancaster and Audrey HepburnUniverse – (Canada)

VVice Raid, starring Mamie Van DorenVillage of the Damned, starring George Sanders and Barbara Shelley – (U.K.)The Virgin Spring (Jungfrukällan), directed by Ingmar Bergman, starring Max von Sydow – (Sweden)Visit to a Small Planet, starring Jerry Lewis

WThe Wackiest Ship in the Army, starring Jack Lemmon and Ricky NelsonWatch Your Stern, starring Eric Barker and Leslie Phillips – (U.K.)When a Woman Ascends the Stairs (Onna ga kaidan wo agaru toki), directed by Mikio Naruse – (Japan)Where the Boys Are, starring George Hamilton, Paula Prentiss, Connie FrancisThe White Horse Inn (Im weißen Rößl) – (West Germany/Austria)Who Was That Lady?, starring Dean Martin, Tony Curtis, Janet LeighWild River, directed by Elia Kazan, starring Montgomery CliftThe World of Suzie Wong, starring Nancy Kwan and William Holden – (U.K./U.S.)

YThe Yellow Gloves (Ta kitrina gantia) – (Greece)The Young One (La Joven), directed by Luis Buñuel – (Mexico/United States)

ZZazie dans le Métro, directed by Louis Malle – (France)

Short film seriesLooney Tunes (1930–1969)Terrytoons (1930–1964)Merrie Melodies (1931–1969)Bugs Bunny (1940–1962)Yosemite Sam (1945–1963)Speedy Gonzales (1953–1968)

Births
January 4 - April Winchell, American actress, voice actress, writer, talk radio host and commentator
January 9 – Terje Pennie, Estonian actress 
January 12 – Oliver Platt, Canadian actor
January 13 – Kevin Anderson, American actor
January 15 - Kelly Asbury, American director, writer and voice actor (died 2020)
January 18 – Mark Rylance, English actor
January 25 - Kerry Noonan, former actress
February 4 - Jenette Goldstein, American actress
February 7 – James Spader, American actor
February 9 - David Bateson, British actor and comedian
February 13 - Matt Salinger, American actor and producer
February 14 – Meg Tilly, Canadian-American actress
February 18
Tony Anselmo, American animator and cartoon voice actor
Greta Scacchi, Italian-Australian actress
February 20 – Wendee Lee, American voice actress
February 21 - Joel McKinnon Miller, American actor
February 28 – Dorothy Stratten, Canadian model and actress (died 1980)
March 12 - Courtney B. Vance, American actor
March 13 - Joe Ranft, American screenwriter, animator and voice actor (died 2005)
March 17
Arye Gross, American actor
Vicki Lewis, American singer and actress
Cameron Thor, American former actor, filmmaker and acting coach
March 25 - Brenda Strong, American actress and director
March 26 - Jennifer Grey, American actress
March 29 - Annabella Sciorra, American actress and producer
March 31 – Michelle Nicastro, American actress and singer (died 2010)
April 1 - Jennifer Runyon, American actress
April 4 – Hugo Weaving, Australian actor
April 7 – Elaine Miles, American actress
April 14 – Brad Garrett, American actor, voice actor, stand-up comedian and professional poker-player
April 23 - Craig Sheffer, American actor
April 29 - Steve Blum, American voice actor
May 3 - Amy Steel, American former actress
May 9 - Lisa Henson, American producer and former actress
May 20 - Tony Goldwyn, American actor, singer, producer, director and political activist
May 21 – Mohanlal, Indian actor
May 24 
Kristin Scott Thomas, English actress
Doug Jones, American actor
May 26 - Doug Hutchison, American character actor
May 31 
Chris Elliott, American actor and comedian
Don Harvey (actor, born 1960), American actor and voice actor
June 5 - James Isaac, American director and visual effects supervisor (died 2012)
June 8 - Gary Trousdale, American animator, director, screenwriter and storyboard artist
June 17 – Thomas Haden Church, American actor
June 27 - Jeremy Swift, English actor
July 5
Brad Loree, Canadian actor and stuntman
Pruitt Taylor Vince, American character actor
July 10 - Jeff Bergman, American voice actor, comedian and impressionist
July 11 – Jafar Panahi, Iranian director
July 14 – Jane Lynch, American actress
July 18 - Barbara Broccoli, American-British producer
July 19 - Elizabeth Kaitan, Hungarian-American actress and model
July 21 - Adrienne King, American actress and voice actress
July 22 - John Leguizamo, American actor, comedian and producer
July 23
Jon Landau (film producer), American film producer
Gabrielle Reidy, Irish actress (died 2014)
August 5 - Steve Bannos, American actor
August 6 - Leland Orser, American actor
August 7
David Duchovny, American actor
Rosana Pastor, Spanish actress 
August 10 – Antonio Banderas, Spanish actor
August 16 – Timothy Hutton, American actor
August 17 – Sean Penn, American actor
August 18 - Richard McCabe, Scottish actor
August 28 – Emma Samms, English actress
August 29 – Viire Valdma, Estonian actress
September 1 – Tahmineh Milani, Iranian filmmaker
September 4 - Damon Wayans, American actor, comedian, producer and writer
September 5 - Denis Forest, Canadian character actor (died 2002)
September 9 – Hugh Grant, English actor
September 10
Nancy Bernstein, American producer (died 2015)
Colin Firth, English actor
September 12
Robert John Burke, American actor
Felicity Montagu, English actress
September 13 - Greg Baldwin, American actor and voice actor
September 14 - Melissa Leo, American actress
September 17
Kevin Clash, American puppeteer, director and producer
Frédéric Pierrot, French actor
September 21 - Mary Mara, American actress (died 2022)
October 1 - Elizabeth Dennehy, American actress
October 5 - Daniel Baldwin, American actor, director and producer
October 9 – Maddie Blaustein, American voice actress (died 2008)
October 12 - Hiroyuki Sanada, Japanese actor
October 15 - Lobo Chan, British actor
October 18 – Jean-Claude Van Damme, Belgian actor
October 24 - BD Wong, American actor
October 25 – Hong Sang-soo, South Korean director
November 5
Tilda Swinton, English actress
Yolanda Vázquez, Spanish actress
November 6 – Lance Kerwin, American actor (died 2023)
November 8 – Michael Nyqvist, Swedish actor (died 2017)
November 9 - Toni Hudson, American actress
November 11 – Stanley Tucci, American actor and film director
November 13 - Neil Flynn, American actor and comedian
November 18
Elizabeth Perkins, American actress
John Shepherd (actor), American actor and producer
November 29 - Cathy Moriarty, American actress and singer
November 30 - Hiam Abbass, Palestinian actress and director
December 3 
Daryl Hannah, American actress
Julianne Moore, American actress
December 9 - Jeff "Swampy" Marsh, American animator, writer, director, producer and voice actor
December 10 
Kenneth Branagh, Northern Irish actor and film director
Michael Schoeffling, American actor and model
December 26 - Temuera Morrison, New Zealand actor 
December 27
Maryam d'Abo, British actress
Traci Wolfe, American actress and model

Deaths
January 1 – Margaret Sullavan, 50, American actress, The Shop Around the Corner, The Mortal StormJanuary 3 – Victor Sjöström, 80, Swedish film actor and director, The Phantom Carriage, Wild StrawberriesJanuary 4 – Dudley Nichols, 64, American screenwriter, Bringing Up Baby, StagecoachJanuary 21 – Matt Moore, 72, Irish-American actor, Seven Brides for Seven Brothers, CoquetteJanuary 24 – John Miljan, 67, American actor, The Plainsman, MississippiFebruary 3 
Fred Buscaglione, 38, Italian actor and singer
Pierre Watkin, 70, American actor, Pride of the Yankees, The HuntedMarch 19 – Sonya Levien, 71, Russian screenwriter, Oklahoma!, Quo Vadis, Interrupted MelodyApril 5 – Alma Kruger, 90, American actress, His Girl Friday, SaboteurApril 25 – Hope Emerson, 62, American actress, Caged, Adam's RibMay 27 – George Zucco, 74, British actor, The Adventures of Sherlock Holmes, My Favorite BlondeJune 4 – Lucien Littlefield, 64, American actor, The Cat and the Canary, Dirty WorkJune 29 – Dimples Cooper, 46, Filipina actress, Ang Tatlong Hambog, Miracles of LoveJuly 2 – Gene Fowler, 70, American screenwriter, What Price Hollywood?, The Call of the WildJuly 15 – Lawrence Tibbett, 63, American singer and actor, The Rogue Song, Under Your SpellJuly 26 – Cedric Gibbons, 67, Irish production designer and art director, An American in Paris, The Bad and the BeautifulJuly 29 – Leonora Corbett, 52, British actress, Love on Wheels, Living DangerouslyAugust 10 – Frank Lloyd, 74, Scottish director, Mutiny on the Bounty, CavalcadeSeptember 4 – Alfred E. Green, 71, American director, Baby Face, Top BananaSeptember 5 – Aku Korhonen, 57, Finnish actor 
September 11 – Edwin Justus Mayer, 63, American screenwriter, To Be or Not to Be, A Royal ScandalOctober 11 – Richard Cromwell, 50, American actor, The Lives of a Bengal Lancer, JezebelOctober 15
Maude Eburne, 84, Canadian actress, The Border Legion, Almost MarriedClara Kimball Young, 70, American actress, My Official Wife, Kept HusbandsNovember 3 – Paul Willis, 59, American silent-film actor, The Fall of a NationNovember 5
Mack Sennett, 80, Canadian-American producer and director, Tillie's Punctured Romance, Tango Tangles 
Ward Bond, 57, American actor, It's a Wonderful Life, The Searchers, Rio BravoNovember 14 – Walter Catlett, 71, American actor, comedian, Slightly Scandalous, Henry, the Rainmaker, Here Comes the GroomNovember 16 – Clark Gable, 59, American actor, It Happened One Night, Mutiny on the Bounty, Gone with the WindNovember 19 – Phyllis Haver, 61, American actress, Chicago, Sal of SingaporeNovember 20 – Betty Lawford, 48, British actress, Criminal Lawyer, The Devil Thumbs a Ride 
December 14 – Gregory Ratoff, 67, Russian actor and director, All About Eve, Intermezzo Film debuts 
Karen Black – The Prime TimeBruce Boa – Man in the MoonDyan Cannon – The Rise and Fall of Legs DiamondRichard Chamberlain – The Secret of the Purple ReefPatrick Cranshaw – The Amazing Transparent ManBruce Dern – Wild RiverAlbert Finney – The EntertainerJane Fonda – Tall Story 
Diane Ladd – Murder, Inc.Sylvia Miles – Murder, Inc.Peter O'Toole – KidnappedRobert Redford – Tall StoryGian Maria Volonté – Under Ten FlagsSusannah York – Tunes of Glory''

Notes

References 

 
Film by year